Quercus vicentensis is a species of oak tree in the family Fagaceae, native to southern Mexico and northern Central America. It is placed in section Quercus.

Distribution and habitat
Quercus vicentensis is endemic to forest habitats in southern Mexico (Chiapas, Jalisco, Guerrero, Michoacán, and Oaxaca states), El Salvador, Guatemala and Honduras.

It grows in humid montane forests between  elevation.

Conservation
Quercus vicentensis is threatened with habitat loss from extensive deforestation throughout its range.

References

External links
Google Books:  "The Central American Species of Quercus" — Quercus vincentensis (Quercus comasaguana); by Cornelius Herman Muller, USDA.
 Oaks of the World: Quercus vicentensis

vicentensis
Oaks of Mexico
Cloud forest flora of Mexico
Flora of El Salvador
Flora of Guatemala
Flora of Honduras
Trees of Southwestern Mexico
Trees of Central America
Taxonomy articles created by Polbot
Trees of Chiapas
Flora of the Chiapas Highlands
Sierra Madre de Chiapas
Taxa named by William Trelease